Andrew McKenzie may refer to:

 Andrew N. J. McKenzie, immunologist
 Andrew McKenzie, (1887–1951) American physician
 Andrew McKenzie (poet) (1780–1839), poet, see Ulster Scots dialects

See also
Andrew MacKenzie (disambiguation)